Muthara is a settlement in Meru County, Kenya.

References 

Populated places in Eastern Province (Kenya)